Foster is an unincorporated community in Mathews County, Virginia, United States. Foster has a post office with ZIP code 23056.

References

Unincorporated communities in Mathews County, Virginia
Unincorporated communities in Virginia